Virei is a town and municipality of Namibe Province, Angola. It has an area of 15,092 km2. The municipality had a population of 32,445 in 2014.

References

Populated places in Namibe Province
Municipalities of Angola